Godfrey Baldacchino (born 25 April 1960) is a Maltese and Canadian social scientist. He was Pro Rector (International Development & Quality Assurance) (2016-2021) and Professor of Sociology at the University of Malta. Between 2016 and 2020, he was (with Jim Randall ) the UNESCO Co-Chair in Island Studies and Sustainability at the University of Prince Edward Island, Canada (a title held in partnership with the University of Malta). 

He is former Director of the Centre for Labour Studies at the University of Malta and is the current chairman of its board.  With Alexander Gatt, Baldacchino founded the Students Astronomical Circle (SAC) in 1978. In 1984, he was elected as the first President of The Malta Astronomical Society which resulted from the merger of the SAC and the Astronomical Association of Malta. He was inscribed as Honorary Life Member of the Malta Astronomical Society in 2015.

Career
Baldacchino served as Canada Research Chair (Island Studies) at the University of Prince Edward Island, Canada, for the full double term of 10 years (2003-2013).

Baldacchino is founding Vice-President of the University of Malta Academic Staff Association (UMASA) and was elected as member of the Council of the University of Malta for the period 2001–2003. As Chair of the Malta Board of Cooperatives (1998–2003), Baldacchino presided over a doubling of registered cooperative societies.

Baldacchino has provided consultancy to the Malta Prime Minister and various other Ministers on: the self-management system at Malta Drydocks, the Student Stipend Scheme, the workings of the Malta Employment and Training Corporation, a code of practice for worker-directors, and the Planning Council's plans for the South of Malta. He has also offered his consultancy services to the General Workers' Union, the Malta Employers' Association, the Malta Hotels and Restaurants Association and the Unjon Haddiema Maghqudin. Baldacchino was elected President of the International Small Islands Studies Association in 2014 and Chair of the Scientific Board of  RETI, the Network of Island Universities, in 2015. He set up Island Studies Journal, which he edited from 2006 to 2017; he also set up Small States & Territories, an on-line open access journal, in 2018.

Baldacchino has served as visiting professor to tertiary education institutions in Australia, Barbados, Fiji, Iceland, Mauritius, Seychelles and Sweden. He has also been invited to deliver papers, guest lectures and/or keynotes in Åland, Bahamas, Bermuda, Canada, Cyprus, Denmark, Finland, France, Germany, Italy, Japan, New Zealand, Philippines, South Korea, St Lucia, Taiwan, Trinidad & Tobago, the UK and USA. His academic work has appeared in French, German, Italian, Japanese, Korean, Portuguese and Swedish (and apart from English and Maltese). With Elaine Stratford and Elizabeth McMahon, he is Editor of the Rethinking the Island book series with Rowman and Littlefield International.

In 2021, Baldacchino was appointed Malta's first (thematic) ambassador for islands and small states.

Publications

Books written
 (with contributors) Solution Protocols to Festering Island Disputes: 'Win-Win' Solutions for the Diaoyu / Senkaku Islands, London: Routledge (2017) , 230pp
 Introducing Social Studies: A Maltese Reader 3rd edition. Malta: Miller Distributors, 2011.(previous editions: 1988, 2000). , 399pp
 Ninvestigaw is-Socjeta, (Investigating Society). 3rd edition. Malta: Miller Distributors, 2011 (previous editions: 1997, 1999). .
 Island Enclaves: Offshoring Strategies, Creative Governance and Subnational Island Jurisdictions. Montreal QC: McGill-Queen's University Press, 2010. (cloth); 978-0-7735-3743-9(paper), 301pp.
 Global Tourism & Informal Labour Relations: The Small Scale Syndrome at Work. London: Mansell, 1997. .

Books edited
 (with Kelly Vodden and Ryan Gibson). Place Peripheral: Place-Based Development in Rural, Island and Remote Regions. St John's NL: ISER Press, 2015. 340pp. .
 Archipelago Tourism: Policies and Practices. Farnham: Ashgate, 2015. . 248pp.
 The Political Economy of Divided Islands: Unified Geographies, Multiple Polities. New York: Palgrave Macmillan, 2013, 256pp
 (with Eve Hepburn) Independence Movements in Subnational Island Jurisdictions.London: Routledge, 2013. .
 (with Anna Baldacchino) A Taste of Islands: 60 Recipes and Stories from our World of Islands. Charlottetown PE: Island Studies Press, 2012. , 264pp.
 Island Songs: A Global Repertoire. Lanham MD: Scarecrow Press, 2011, 297pp.
 Extreme Heritage Management: Policies and Practices from Densely Populated Islands. New York & Oxford: Berghahn Books, 2012. , 274pp.
 (with Daniel Niles) Island Futures: Conservation and Development across the Asia-Pacific Region. Tokyo, Japan: Springer, 2011. , 182pp.
 (with Rob Greenwood and Lawrence Felt) Remote Control: Governance Lessons for and from Small, Insular and Remote Regions. St John's NL: ISER Press, 2009, 309pp.
 (with David Milne) The Case for Non-Sovereignty: Lessons from Sub-National Island Jurisdictions. London: Routledge. 2008, 176pp.
 (with Kathleen Stuart) Pulling Strings: Policy Insights for Prince Edward Island from other Sub-National Island Jurisdictions. Charlottetown, PEI, Island Studies Press, 2008, 198pp. Book Launch video here:
 Bridging Islands: The Impact of Fixed Links. Charlottetown, Canada: Acorn Press, 2007, 284pp.
 A World of Islands: An Island Studies Reader. Canada and Malta: Institute of Island Studies & Agenda Academic. 2007. , 640pp.
 Extreme Tourism: Lessons from the World's Cold Water Islands. Oxford: Elsevier Science, 2006. , 291pp.
 (with Antoinette Caruana and Mario Grixti) Managing People in Malta: Case Studies in Local Human Resource Management Practice. Malta: Agenda Publishers and Foundation for Human Resources Development, 2003.
 (with Charles J. Farrugia) Educational Management and Planning in Small States: Concepts and Experiences. London: Commonwealth Secretariat, 2002. , 305pp.
 (with David Milne): Lessons from the Political Economy of Small Islands: The Resourcefulness of Jurisdiction. Basingstoke and New York: Macmillan and St Martin's Press, 2000. , 267pp.
 (with Robert Greenwood) Competing Strategies of Socio-Economic Development for Small Islands. Charlottetown, Canada: Institute of Island Studies, University of Prince Edward Island, 1998. 
 (with Peter Mayo) Beyond Schooling: Adult Education in Malta. Msida, Malta: Mireva, 1997. 
 (with Klitos Symeonides) Cyprus and Malta on the Threshold of the European Union: Challenges to Workers and Trade Unions. Nicosia, Cyprus: Government Press, 1996.
 (with Saviour Rizzo and Edward L. Zammit) Co-operative Ways of Working. Msida, Malta: Workers` Participation Development Centre & Friedrich Ebert Stiftung, 1994.
 (with Ronald G. Sultana) Maltese Society: A Sociological Inquiry. Msida, Malta: Mireva, 1994. .

References

External links
 
 
 
 Profile on OAR@UM

1960 births
Place of birth missing (living people)
Living people
Canadian sociologists
Maltese sociologists
Sociology educators
Maltese-language writers from Canada
Academic staff of the University of Malta
Academic staff of the University of Prince Edward Island